Chan Yan Kit (born 10 December 1985) is a badminton player from Hong Kong. He competed at the Asian Games from 2006 to 2014.

Career 
He competed at the 2006 IBF World Championships in men's singles and was defeated in first round by Eric Pang. The next year he reached quarterfinals at the 2007 Badminton Asia Championships, losing against Yeoh Kay Bin 13-21, 21-9, 21-14. In 2009, he won the me's singles title at the New Zealand Open Grand Prix tournament. In 2012, he also won the Swedish Masters.

Achievements

BWF Grand Prix 
The BWF Grand Prix had two levels, the Grand Prix and Grand Prix Gold. It was a series of badminton tournaments sanctioned by the Badminton World Federation (BWF) and played between 2007 and 2017. The World Badminton Grand Prix was sanctioned by the International Badminton Federation from 1983 to 2006.

Men's singles

  BWF Grand Prix Gold tournament
  BWF & IBF Grand Prix tournament

BWF International Challenge/Series 
Men's singles

  BWF International Challenge tournament
  BWF International Series tournament

References

External links 
 

1985 births
Living people
Hong Kong male badminton players
Badminton players at the 2006 Asian Games
Badminton players at the 2010 Asian Games
Badminton players at the 2014 Asian Games
Asian Games competitors for Hong Kong